Qazan Ali (also Romanized as Qāzān ‘Alī and Qāzān‘alī; also known as Qāzān Āghelī and Qāzān Oghlī) is a village in Bash Qaleh Rural District, in the Central District of Urmia County, West Azerbaijan Province, Iran. At the 2006 census, its population was 119, in 27 families.

References 

Populated places in Urmia County